Big Machine is the thirteenth studio album by the Japanese rock duo B'z, released on September 17, 2003.

Track listing
"Arakure" – 3:25
"Yasei no Energy" – 4:39
"Wake Up, Right Now" – 3:18
"Hakanai Diamond" (Hakanai Daiyamondo) – 3:28
"I'm in Love?" – 2:59
"It's Showtime!!" – 4:00
"Ai to Nikushimi no Hajimari" – 4:26
"Big Machine" – 3:34
"Nightbird" – 3:56
"Bluesy na Asa" (Burūji na Asa) – 3:57
"Mabushii Sign" (Mabushii Sain) – 4:05
"Change the Future" - 3:56
"Roots" – 5:13

Personnel
Tak Matsumoto – guitar
Koshi Inaba – vocals

Additional personnel
Akihito Tokunaga – bass and programming
Brian Tichy – drums (tracks 2, 3, 4, 5, 7, 12)
Chris Frazier – drums (track 10)
Shane Gaalaas – drums (tracks 1, 2, 6, 8, 9, 11, 13)

Charts

Certifications

References

B'z albums
Being Inc. albums
2003 albums
Japanese-language albums